Behbahan County is in Khuzestan province, Iran. The capital of the county is Behbahan. At the 2006 census, the county's population was 172,597, in 39,607 households. The following census in 2011 counted 179,703 people in 47,618 households. At the 2016 census, the county's population was 180,593 in 51,838 households, by which time Aghajari District had been separated from the county to form Aghajari County.

Administrative divisions

The population history and structural changes of Behbahan County's administrative divisions over three consecutive censuses are shown in the following table. The latest census shows three districts, six rural districts, and four cities.

See also
Arrajan

References

 

Counties of Khuzestan Province